John Kimball (April 13, 1821 – June 1, 1912) was an American engineer and politician who served as the mayor of Concord, New Hampshire and as the President of the New Hampshire Senate.

Early life
Kimball was born in Canterbury, New Hampshire to Benjamin and Ruth (Ames) Kimball on April 13, 1821.  As a young child he moved with his family to Boscawen, New Hampshire where he was educated in the local public schools. Kimball then went to Concord Academy in Concord, New Hampshire for one year, after which he went to work as an apprentice for one of his relatives where he learned how to construct mills and machinery.

Family life
On May 27, 1846, Kimball married Maria H. Phillips of Rupert, Vermont. They had one child, a daughter Clara Maria Kimball. Maria Kimball died on December 22, 1894, and Kimball married Charlotte Atkinson on October 15, 1895.

Concord City Council
In 1856 Kimball was elected to the Common Council of Concord, New Hampshire. He was reelected and chosen President of that body the next year.

State House of Representatives
In 1857 Kimball was elected to the New Hampshire House of Representatives, and he was reelected in 1859. In his second year in the legislature, Kimball served as the Chair on the committee on state prison.

Mayor of Concord
Kimball was elected the Mayor of Concord, New Hampshire in 1872, and reelected in each of the next three years.

State Senate
In November 1880 Kimball was elected to the New Hampshire Senate from District Number Ten, and when the legislature was organized he was chosen as President of the New Hampshire Senate.

Death
Kimball died on June 2, 1913, at his home in Concord, New Hampshire.

Notes

1821 births
1913 deaths
Mayors of Concord, New Hampshire
American chief executives
Republican Party members of the New Hampshire House of Representatives
Republican Party New Hampshire state senators
Presidents of the New Hampshire Senate
American Congregationalists
New Hampshire city council members
19th-century American politicians
People from Canterbury, New Hampshire
People from Boscawen, New Hampshire
19th-century American businesspeople